Wilbur Slabber (born 2 December 1980) was a Namibian cricketer. He was a right-handed batsman and a right-arm offbreak bowler. He represented the Namibian Under-19s cricket team in two consecutive Under-19 Cricket World Cups in 1998 and 2000.

Finishing not out in his first innings against Denmark in January 1998, he fluctuated between the lower and lower-middle order during the following World Cup in 2000, playing higher against stronger opposition.

Slabber made his first appearance for Namibia for over two years in a List A match against Canada in 2007, bowling five overs. Slabber's debut first-class appearance came in the South African Airways Provincial Challenge against Griqualand West in November 2007.

External links
Wilbur Slabber at Cricket Archive 

1980 births
Namibian cricketers
Cricketers from Windhoek
Living people